Videm is a settlement next to Dol pri Ljubljani in the southeastern part of the Upper Carniola region of Slovenia.

References

External links

Videm on Geopedia

Populated places in the Municipality of Dol pri Ljubljani